Zilpha Grant (29 July 1919 – 31 January 2011), later known by her married name Zilpha Wheelton, was an English freestyle swimmer who competed for Great Britain in the 1936 Summer Olympics.

She was born in Chorlton-cum-Hardy, Manchester.

In 1936 she was a member of the British relay team which finished sixth in the 4×100-metre freestyle relay event. In the 100-metre freestyle competition she was eliminated in the first round.

At the 1938 Empire Games she was a member of the English relay team which won the bronze medal in the 4×110-yard freestyle contest.

External links
Zilpha Grant's profile at Sports Reference.com
Zilpha Grant's obituary

1919 births
2011 deaths
English female swimmers
Olympic swimmers of Great Britain
Swimmers at the 1936 Summer Olympics
Swimmers at the 1938 British Empire Games
Commonwealth Games bronze medallists for England
People from Chorlton-cum-Hardy
Commonwealth Games medallists in swimming
Medallists at the 1938 British Empire Games